Platypus australis, commonly known as the polyphagous pinhole borer, is a species of ambrosia beetle in the weevil family Curculionidae found in Australia. It only eats superficial layers of wood, hence the damage is trivial.                                                                                                                                       '

References 

Platypodinae
Beetles of Australia
Beetles described in 1865